DYDH (1485 AM) is a relay station of DZRH, owned and operated by Manila Broadcasting Company through its licensee Pacific Broadcasting System. The station's transmitter is located at Nabitasan, Lapaz, Iloilo City, sharing tower site with DYOK Aksyon Radyo.

References

External links
DZRH FB Page
DZRH Website

Radio stations in Iloilo City
News and talk radio stations in the Philippines
Radio stations established in 1995
DZRH Nationwide stations